Kononenko is a surname. It may refer to:

 Anatoly Kononenko (born 1935), Soviet sprint canoer
 Andriy Kononenko (born 1974), Ukrainian footballer
 Dmitry Kononenko (born 1988), Ukrainian chess grandmaster
 Elena Kononenko, Ukrainian swimmer
 Ihor Kononenko (born 1965), Ukrainian businessman and politician
 Kirill Kononenko (born 1992), Russian ice hockey player
 Maxim Kononenko (born 1971), Russian journalist and TV show host
 Mykhaylo Kononenko (born 1987), Ukrainian road cyclist
 Natalia Kononenko (born 1994), Ukrainian gymnast
 Natalie Kononenko, Canadian professor of folklore
 Oleg Grigoriyevich Kononenko (1938–1980), Soviet cosmonaut
 Oleg Kononenko (born 1964), Russian cosmonaut
 Olga Kononenko (born 1991), Russian beauty pageant contestant
 Roman Kononenko (born 1981), Ukrainian track cyclist
 Tatiana Kononenko (born 1978), Ukrainian chess player
 Valeriya Kononenko (born 1990), Ukrainian racing cyclist
 Vladimir Kononenko (born 1971), Russian footballer

See also
 

Russian-language surnames
Ukrainian-language surnames